Julio César Irrazábal León (born 25 November 1980 in San Juan del Paraná, Itapúa) is a Paraguayan footballer who plays for Deportivo Capiatá.

After playing for clubs in Spain and Argentina, on 26 June 2008 he signed with Cerro Porteño a contract of a year of duration.

Clubs

References

External links 
 Profile & Statistics at Guardian's Stats Centre
 Argentine Primera statistics  

1980 births
Living people
Paraguayan footballers
Paraguay international footballers
Paraguayan expatriate footballers
Paraguayan people of Basque descent
Association football defenders
Club Sol de América footballers
Hércules CF players
Club Guaraní players
Club Nacional footballers
Cerro Porteño players
River Plate (Asunción) footballers
CR Vasco da Gama players
San Martín de San Juan footballers
Aldosivi footballers
Sportivo Carapeguá footballers
Sportivo Luqueño players
Deportivo Capiatá players
Segunda División players
Paraguayan Primera División players
Primera Nacional players
Campeonato Brasileiro Série A players
Expatriate footballers in Spain
Expatriate footballers in Argentina
Expatriate footballers in Brazil
Paraguayan expatriate sportspeople in Spain
Paraguayan expatriate sportspeople in Argentina
Paraguayan expatriate sportspeople in Brazil